Sylvina Cecil Pais is an Indian athlete. She won a silver medal in the 4 × 400 m relay  in the 1993 Asian Athletics Championships. She was the National champion in 400 metres hurdles in 1992 and 1993.

References

Living people
Year of birth missing (living people)
Indian female sprinters
Indian female hurdlers